In mathematics, differential Galois theory studies the Galois groups of differential equations.

Overview
Whereas algebraic Galois theory studies extensions of algebraic fields, differential Galois theory studies extensions of differential fields, i.e. fields that are equipped with a derivation, D. Much of the theory of differential Galois theory is parallel to algebraic Galois theory. One difference between the two constructions is that the Galois groups in differential Galois theory tend to be matrix Lie groups, as compared with the finite groups often encountered in algebraic Galois theory.

See also
Picard–Vessiot theory

References

 Juan J. Morales Ruiz : Differential Galois Theory and Non-Integrability of Hamiltonian Systems, Birkhaeuser, 1999, ISBN‎ 978-3764360788 . 

Galois theory
Differential algebra
Differential equations
Algebraic groups